Buprestis striata is a species of metallic wood-boring beetle in the family Buprestidae. It is found in the Caribbean Sea and North America.

References

Further reading

External links

 

Buprestidae
Articles created by Qbugbot
Beetles described in 1775
Taxa named by Johan Christian Fabricius